Paul Nguyễn Thanh Hoan (11 November 1932 – 18 August 2014) was a Vietnamese Roman Catholic prelate. He was Bishop of Phan Thiết from 2005 to 2009.

Biography
Paul Hoan was born in Vinh, Nghệ An in 1932. From 1959 to 1965, he studied at Xuân Bích Major Seminary in Saigon. On 29 April 1965, he was ordained a priest at the Notre-Dame Saigon and was assigned to Đông Hà Parish in Quảng Trị. In 1968, he completed a bachelor's degree in philosophy. In 1978, he was named pastor of Bồ Câu Trắng (now Thánh Linh) parish in Phan Thiết. From 1999 to 2001, he was Dean of Hàm Tân Deanery.

On 14 July 2001, Pope John Paul II appointed him Coadjutor Bishop of Phan Thiết. He was consecrated on 11 August 2001 by Bishop Nicolas Huỳnh Văn Nghi. From 2001 to 2006, he was Head of Committee on Charitable and Social Actions - Caritas Vietnam.

On 5 April 2005, Bishop Paul succeeded Nicolas Huỳnh Văn Nghi as Bishop of Phan Thiết. He resigned on 25 July 2009 due to age limit and was succeeded by Joseph Vũ Duy Thống.

External links
 Profile, catholic-hierarchy.org; accessed 18 May 2015.

1932 births
2014 deaths
21st-century Roman Catholic bishops in Vietnam
People from Nghệ An province